Louis Wolfson (born 1931 in New York) is an American author who writes in French. Treated for schizophrenia since childhood, he cannot bear hearing or reading his native language and has invented a method of immediately translating every English sentence into a foreign phrase with the same sound and meaning.

Biography
Diagnosed with schizophrenia at an early age, Louis Wolfson was placed in psychiatric institutes during his adolescence, where he underwent severe treatments, notably electroconvulsive therapy (ECT). This period left him with distrust and hatred for people, as well as a radical detestation of his native language which he refused to use. He learned foreign languages (notably French, German, Hebrew and Russian), and became used to spontaneously translating (through a sophisticated technique) whatever was said to him in English into a Sabir of these languages.

In 1963, Wolfson submitted a manuscript to the French publishers Gallimard in which he set out, in French, the principles of his linguistic system, and how he employed it in his daily life. Le Schizo et les langues (Schizophrenia and Languages) was  published in 1970 in the collection "Connaissance de l'Inconscient" that had just been launched by writer and psychoanalyst Jean-Bertrand Pontalis. It generated great critical interest, due in parts to its introduction by Gilles Deleuze. Seven years later, Wolfson's mother died of complications from an ovarian tumour. The author, now liberated from her guardianship, left New York and moved to Montreal in 1984. 

There, Wolfson wrote an account of the last months of their divided lives, marked by his mother's agony and his obsessive practice of betting on horses. The text — Ma mère, musicienne, est morte... (My Mother, a Musician, Has Died) — uses the same humor and staggering language of Le Schizo et les langues, but is also charged with the drama of the illness. It was published in 1984 by Éditions Navarin. The text has become scarce. He wrote a new version during 2011. It was published by éditions Attila in 2014.

Since November 1994, he has lived in Puerto Rico where he became a millionaire on 9 April 2003 after winning the lottery.

Bibliography
  (new edition in 1987)
  (changes and additions to Le Schizo et les langues)
 (changes and additions to Le Schizo et les langues, translated into English)

External links
 "Louis Wolfson et la finance" Éditions Attila.  
 Wolfson dit merde à la mort", Le Fric-Frac Club.  
 Louis Wolfson, « L'étudiant de langues schizophrénique », in La Revue des ressources.  
 L'Absentéisme verbal de Louis Wolfson schizo, École lacanienne de psychanalyse.

References
 
Notes

1931 births
Writers from New York (state)
20th-century American writers
American writers in French
People with schizophrenia
Living people